Goodenia lancifolia, commonly known as scruffy goodenia, is a species of flowering plant in the family Goodeniaceae and is endemic to the far south-west corner of Western Australia. It is a perennial herb with linear to narrow egg-shaped at the base and stem-clasping, lance-shaped to egg-shaped stem-leaves and blue flowers with a white centre.

Description
Flowering mostly occurs in January and the fruit is an elliptic to oval capsule.

Taxonomy and naming
Goodenia lancifolia was first formally described in 2000 by Leigh William Sage and Raymond Jeffrey Cranfield in the journal Nuytsia from specimens collected near Pemberton in 2000. The specific epithet (lancifolia) means "lance-leaved".

Distribution and habitat
This goodenia grows in winter-wet swamps and on the edge of lakes  in the far south-west of south-western Western Australia.

Conservation status
Goodenia lancifolia is classified as "not threatened" by the Government of Western Australia Department of Parks and Wildlife.

References

lancifolia
Eudicots of Western Australia
Plants described in 2000
Endemic flora of Western Australia